Me and Mrs Jones is a British comedy about the life of a woman named Gemma Jones. The first series began on 12 October 2012 on BBC One. It stars Sarah Alexander and Neil Morrissey.

On 10 December 2012, it was announced that the comedy would not return for a second series.

Synopsis
Gemma Jones is the mother of twin daughters Charlotte and Jess and adult son Alfie. The show follows Gemma's life as she navigates relationships with Tom, the father of one her daughters' playmates, and Billy, a friend of Alfie's.

Cast
 Sarah Alexander – Gemma Jones – The main character of the series and the mother of Alfie, Charlotte and Jess.
 Neil Morrissey – Jason Jones – Gemma's ex-husband and Charlotte and Jess's father.
 Jonathan Bailey – Alfie Jones – Gemma's son and Charlotte and Jess's older half-brother.
 Robert Sheehan – Billy Delaney – Alfie's friend and one of Gemma's love interests
 Nathaniel Parker – Tom Marshall – Gemma's admirer and the father of Poppy.
 Vera Filatova – Inca – Jason's girlfriend.
 Kelle Bryan – Fran – Gemma's friend.
 Katherine Jakeways – Caroline
 Danni Bennatar – Charlotte Jones – Jess's twin sister, Alfie's half sister and Gemma and Jason's daughter.   
 Sophie Alibert – Jess Jones – Charlotte's twin sister, Alfie's half sister and Gemma and Jason's daughter. 
 Madeleine Harris – Poppy – Tom's daughter and one of Charlotte and Jess's classmates.

Episodes

Series 1 (2012)

Reception
Me and Mrs Jones was not received kindly in early reviews. Writing for The Stage, reviewer Harry Venning wrote:
Of the many unkind epithets suggested by Roget’s Thesaurus, excruciating is the one that best describes this show. Until I watched it, I did not realise it was physically possible to grit one’s teeth, curl one’s toes and clench one’s sphincter all at the same time. And stay that way for half an hour.
Metro's reviewer was somewhat kinder, calling Me and Mrs Jones "grown-up comedy with child-like humour" (going on to explain that "child-like" was more akin to "childish").

The British Comedy Guide reviewed it as follows: "We absolutely loved Me And Mrs Jones; it mightn't have had the packed-out laughs of a studio sitcom, but it oozed warmth, good humour and all-round likeability...If a second series isn't commissioned of this heart-warming, laugh-out-loud comedy, it'll be the televisual crime of the year."

DVD release
Me and Mrs Jones was due for release on 26 November 2012.

References

External links
 
 
 

2010s British sitcoms
2012 British television series debuts
2012 British television series endings
BBC television sitcoms
Television shows shot at Teddington Studios
Television series by Hartswood Films